David Valero Serrano (born 27 December 1988 in Baza, Granada) is a Spanish cross-country mountain biker. At the 2020 Summer Olympics, he won the bronze medal in the Men's cross-country event. Previously, at the 2016 Summer Olympics, he finished 9th in the Men's cross-country event. He was on the start list for the 2018 Cross-country European Championship and he finished 3rd.

Major results

2021
 1st  Cross-country, National Championships
 3rd  Cross-country, Olympic Games
2022
 National Championships
1st  Cross-country
1st  Short track
 UCI XCO World Cup
1st Snowshoe
2nd Vallnord
3rd Mont-Sainte-Anne
 Copa Catalana Internacional
1st Vallnord
 2nd  Cross-country, UCI World Championships

References

Spanish male cyclists
Cross-country mountain bikers
1988 births
Living people
Cyclists at the 2016 Summer Olympics
Cyclists at the 2020 Summer Olympics
Medalists at the 2020 Summer Olympics
Olympic bronze medalists for Spain
Olympic cyclists of Spain
Olympic medalists in cycling
Sportspeople from Granada
Cyclists from Andalusia